Wide-angle Infinity Display Equipment (WIDE), the proprietary name for a cross-cockpit collimated display (CCCD) wide-angle display system invented by the UK Rediffusion company at their factory at Crawley, near Gatwick, UK, now part of Thales UK. The general design is now in common use in most full flight simulators, made by Thales and several other companies worldwide.

See also
Collimated light

Display technology